Anita Horvat (born 7 September 1996) is a Slovenian sprinter and middle-distance runner. She placed seventh in the 800 metres at the 2022 World Athletics Championships. Horvat won the silver medal in the event at the 2023 European Indoor Championships.

She is the Slovenian record holder for the 400 metres out and indoors, and a multiple national champion.

Career
Anita Horvat competed in the women's 400 metres at the 2017 and 2019 World Athletics Championships.

She also represented Slovenia in the event at the 2020 Tokyo Olympics.

In March 2022, Horvat won the 400 m at the Balkan Indoor Championships held in Istanbul, Turkey. She finished second over the 800 metres at the outdoor Balkan Championships in Craiova, Romania in June that year. The following month she placed second in the 400m at the Mediterranean Games staged in Oran, Algeria.

In January 2023, Horvat won the 800 metres at the Init Indoor Meeting Karlsruhe in Germany, a World Athletics Indoor Tour Gold meeting, beating 2022 world indoor silver medallist Freweyni Hailu.

Personal bests
 100 metres – 11.79 (+1.2 m/s, Celje 2017)
 200 metres – 23.47 (0.0 m/s, Kranj 2017)
 200 metres indoor – 23.10 (Metz 2021)
 400 metres – 51.22 (Monaco 2018) 
 400 metres indoor – 52.22 (Madrid 2018) 
 800 metres – 1:58.96 (Chorzów 2022)
 800 metres indoor – 2:00.44 (Karlsruhe 2023)

References

External links
 

1996 births
Living people
Slovenian female sprinters
World Athletics Championships athletes for Slovenia
Place of birth missing (living people)
Athletes (track and field) at the 2020 Summer Olympics
Olympic athletes of Slovenia
Olympic female sprinters
20th-century Slovenian women
21st-century Slovenian women
European Games competitors for Slovenia
Athletes (track and field) at the 2019 European Games
Athletes (track and field) at the 2022 Mediterranean Games
Mediterranean Games medalists in athletics
Mediterranean Games silver medalists for Slovenia